Mosier is the surname of the following people
Carli Mosier, American voice actress and singer
 Charles Mosier (1941–2006), American Pentecostal bishop
Chris Mosier, American transgender advocate, triathlete, and speaker
Elizabeth Mosier, American author and professor
Harold G. Mosier (1889–1971), U.S. Representative from Ohio
 John Mosier, American academic
 Scott Mosier (born 1971), Canadian American film producer, editor, podcaster, writer and actor
Susan Mosier (born 1959), American legislator and politician